Tannoura, is a  local authority  situated in Rashaya District, Lebanon.

History
In 1838, Eli Smith noted  Tannura's population as being Druze.

References

Bibliography

External links
Tannoura, localiban

Populated places in Rashaya District
Druze communities in Lebanon